The Best Is Yet to Come is a 1982 studio album by American jazz musician Grover Washington Jr. released via Elektra label. The album includes his major hit "The Best Is Yet to Come" recorded with Patti LaBelle.

Reception
A reviewer of Billboard wrote "When a musician of unassailable integrity, honesty and commitment makes a bold, adventurous statement about his art, what do you do? You believe him". Ron Wynn of AllMusic stated "On The Best Is Yet to Come, the title cut was a major R&B hit, with Patti Labelle doing vocals. The rest, unfortunately, is formulaic fusion".

Track listing

Personnel 
 Grover Washington, Jr. – alto saxophone (1), tenor saxophone (2, 6), arrangements (2, 3, 4, 7, 8), soprano saxophone (3, 7, 8), saxello (4, 5), synthesizers (7)
 Richard Tee – Fender Rhodes (1, 5, 6), clavinet (6), keyboards (8)
 Paul Griffin – Oberheim OB-Xa (1, 5), synthesizers (6)
 James K. Lloyd – keyboards (2, 3, 4, 7), acoustic piano (3, 4)
 Dexter Wansel – Oberheim OB-Xa (2, 3, 4), arrangements (2, 7), synthesizers (7)
 Teddi Schlossman – Rhodes piano (3)
 Billy Childs – acoustic piano (8), synthesizers (8)
 Eric Gale – guitar (1, 5, 6)
 Herb Smith – guitar (2)
 Richard Steacker – guitar (3, 4, 7)
 Lee Ritenour – guitar (8)
 Marcus Miller – bass (1, 5, 6)
 Cedric A. Napoleon – bass (2, 3, 4, 7), lead vocals (7)
 Abraham Laboriel – bass (8)
 Yogi Horton – drums (1, 5, 6)
 Darryl Washington – drums (2, 3, 4, 7)
 Harvey Mason – drums (8)
 Ralph MacDonald – percussion (1, 5, 6), bells (2), shaker (2)
 Leonard Gibbs – percussion (3, 4, 7)
 Victor Feldman – percussion (8)
 Kevin Johnson – percussion (8)
 Alex Foster – saxophone (1)
 Frank Wess – saxophone (1)
 Jon Faddis – trumpet (1)
 Mona Goldman-Yoskin – flute (3)
 William Eaton – arrangements (1, 5, 6)
 Cynthia Biggs – arrangements (7)
 Patti LaBelle – lead and backing vocals (2)
 Bobby McFerrin – lead and backing vocals (4)
 Carla L. Benson – backing vocals (7)
 Evette Benton – backing vocals (7)
 Lucille Jones – backing vocals (7)

Production 
 Grover Washington, Jr. – producer, executive producer, mixing 
 Ralph MacDonald – producer (1, 5, 6), mixing 
 Dexter Wansel – producer (2, 3, 4, 7)
 Nathan Sassover – producer (8)
 Richard Alderson – engineer (1, 5, 6), mixing 
 Kendall Brown – engineer (1, 5, 6), mixing 
 Peter Humphreys – engineer (2, 3, 4, 7), mixing 
 Dennis Sands – engineer (8)
 Eddie Heath – assistant engineer (1, 5, 6)
 Lamont Moreno – assistant engineer (1, 5, 6)
 Barry Craig – assistant engineer (2, 3, 4, 7)
 Scott E. MacMinn – assistant engineer (2, 3, 4, 7)
 John Wisner – assistant engineer (2, 3, 4, 7)
 Greg Orloff – assistant engineer (8)
 Vlado Meller – mastering at CBS Studios (New York, NY).
 Janaire Boger – production coordinator 
 Paul Silverthorn – production coordinator 
 Ron Coro – art direction, design 
 Denise Minobe – art direction, design  
 Jim Shea – photography

Charts

References

Grover Washington Jr. albums
1982 albums
Elektra Records albums